The Jerome City Pump House is a water works building located near Jerome, Idaho that was built in 1922 by stonemason H.T. Pugh.  It was listed on the National Register of Historic Places in 1983.

See also
 List of National Historic Landmarks in Idaho
 National Register of Historic Places listings in Jerome County, Idaho

References

1922 establishments in Idaho
Buildings and structures in Jerome County, Idaho
Industrial buildings and structures on the National Register of Historic Places in Idaho
Infrastructure completed in 1922
National Register of Historic Places in Jerome County, Idaho
Water in Idaho
Water supply pumping stations on the National Register of Historic Places
Lava rock buildings and structures